Wegdahl is an unincorporated community in Chippewa County, in the U.S. state of Minnesota.

History
A post office called Wegdahl was established in 1871, and remained in operation until it was discontinued in 1957. The community was named for Hemming Arntzen Wegdahl, the original owner of the town site and first postmaster.

References

Unincorporated communities in Chippewa County, Minnesota
Unincorporated communities in Minnesota